Freedom Child is a 1972 opera by the American composer Evelyn La Rue Pittman, in memory of Martin Luther King Jr.

References

Operas